The 2022–23 season is the 126th in the history of Udinese Calcio and their 28th consecutive season in the top flight. The club are participating in Serie A and the Coppa Italia.

Players

Out on loan

Pre-season and friendlies

Competitions

Overall record

Serie A

League table

Results summary

Results by round

Matches 
The league fixtures were announced on 24 June 2022.

Coppa Italia

Statistics

Appearances and goals

|-
! colspan=14 style=background:#dcdcdc; text-align:center"| Goalkeepers

|-
! colspan=14 style=background:#dcdcdc; text-align:center"| Defenders

|- 
! colspan=14 style=background:#dcdcdc; text-align:center"| Midfielders

|-
! colspan=14 style=background:#dcdcdc; text-align:center"| Forwards

|-
! colspan=14 style=background:#dcdcdc; text-align:center"| Players transferred out during the season

References

Udinese Calcio seasons
Udinese